Betsy Byars (née Cromer; August 7, 1928 – February 26, 2020) was an American author of children's books.  Her novel Summer of the Swans won the 1971 Newbery Medal. She has also received a National Book Award for Young People's Literature for The Night Swimmers (1980)
and an Edgar Award for Wanted ... Mud Blossom (1991).

Byars has been called "one of the ten best writers for children in the world" by Nancy Chambers, editor of the British literary journal Signal, and in 1987 Byars received the Regina Medal for lifetime achievement from the Catholic Library Association. Due to the popularity of her books with children, she was listed as one of the Educational Paperback Association's top 100 authors.

Biography 
Betsy Cromer Byars was born August 7, 1928, in Charlotte, North Carolina to George Guy, a cotton mill executive, and Nan (née Rugheimer) Cromer, a homemaker. Her childhood was spent during the Great Depression. She attended Furman University in Greenville, South Carolina, from 1946 to 1948, before transferring to Queens College in Charlotte, where she graduated in 1950 with a bachelor's degree in English.

After graduating, Cromer met Edward Ford Byars, a graduate student in engineering at Clemson University, and they married on June 24, 1950. They had three daughters and a son between 1951 and 1958: Laurie, Betsy Ann, Nan, and Guy. In 1956, the family moved from Clemson, South Carolina, to Urbana, Illinois, where Edward pursued further graduate work at the University of Illinois, eventually becoming a professor of engineering at West Virginia University in 1960. While her husband was busy during the day with his studies, Betsy began writing for magazines. Her work was eventually featured in The Saturday Evening Post, Look, Everywoman's Magazine, and TV Guide. Her first novel, Clementine, was published in 1962. Betsy and Ed Byars are both licensed aircraft pilots and lived on an airstrip in Seneca, South Carolina, the bottom floor of their house being a hangar.

Daughters Betsy Duffey and Laurie Myers are also children's writers.

Byars moved back to Seneca in 1980 and retired in 1990. She died in Seneca on February 26, 2020.

Works

1962 Clementine
1965 The Dancing Camel
1966 Rama, the Gypsy Cat
1967 The Groober     
1968 The Midnight Fox
1970 Summer of the Swans
1971 Go and Hush the Baby
1972 The House of Wings
1973 The Eighteenth Emergency —winner of the Dorothy Canfield Fisher Children's Book Award
1974 After the Goat Man
1975  The Lace Snail
1976 The TV Kid
1977 The Pinballs
1978 The Cartoonist
1978 The Winged Colt of Casa Mia
1979 Good-bye, Chicken Little
1979 Trouble River
1980 The Night Swimmers —National Book Award, Children's Fiction
1981 The Cybil War
1982 The Animal, The Vegetable, and John D. Jones
1982 The Two-Thousand-Pound Goldfish
1983 The Glory Girl
1984 The Computer Nut
1985 Cracker Jackson  
1991 The Seven Treasure Hunts
1992 Coast to Coast
1993 McMummy
1995 Growing Up Stories
1996 The Joy Boys
1996 Tornado (illustrated by Doron Ben-Ami)
2000  Me Tarzan
2002 Keeper of the Doves
2004 Top Teen Stories (contribution)

Series
Ant
1996 My Brother, Ant
1997 Ant Plays Bear

Bingo Brown
1988 The Burning Questions of Bingo Brown
1991 Bingo Brown and the Language of Love
1992 Bingo Brown, Gypsy Lover
1992 Bingo Brown's Guide to Romance

Boo
2006 Boo's Dinosaur
2009 Boo's Surprise

Blossom Family
1986 The Not-Just-Anybody Family
1986 The Blossoms Meet the Vulture Lady
1987 The Blossoms and the Green Phantom
1987 A Blossom Promise
1991 Wanted...Mud Blossom

Golly Sisters
1985 The Golly Sisters Go West
1990 Hooray for the Golly Sisters
1994 The Golly Sisters Ride Again"

Herculeah Jones
1994 The Dark Stairs1995 Tarot Says Beware1996 Dead Letter1997 Death's Door1998 Disappearing Acts2006 King of Murder2006 The Black TowerCollaborations with daughters Betsy Duffey and Laurie Myers
2000 My Dog, My Hero2004 The SOS File2007 Dog Diaries2010 Cat DiariesMemoir
1991 The Moon and IShort stories
 Look back at the Sea''

References

Citations
Autobiography. Retrieved July 2, 2006.
Betsy Byars. Random House, Inc. Retrieved July 2, 2006.
Books by Betsy Byars. Retrieved August 5, 2006.
The Alan Review

External links

 
 
  Betsy Byars Papers Part I and  Part II at Clemson University Special Collections Library
 
 Betsey Duffey at LC Authorities, with 27 records
 Laurie Myers at LC Authorities, with 11 records

1928 births
2020 deaths
20th-century American novelists
20th-century American short story writers
20th-century American women writers
21st-century American novelists
21st-century American short story writers
21st-century American women writers
American children's writers
American historical novelists
American memoirists
American women aviators
American women children's writers
American women novelists
American women short story writers
Edgar Award winners
Furman University alumni
National Book Award for Young People's Literature winners
Newbery Medal winners
Novelists from North Carolina
Novelists from South Carolina
Queens University of Charlotte alumni
Writers of historical fiction set in the modern age
Writers from Charlotte, North Carolina